Snowgoons Dynasty is the tenth studio album by German hip hop production team the Snowgoons. Pressed as a double album, it was released on July 17, 2012 via Babygrande Records. It features guest appearances from various hip hop recording artists, including Fredro Starr, Ghostface Killah, Ill Bill, Joell Ortiz, Killah Priest, Krondon, L.A.R.S., Lil' Fame, Planet Asia, Ras Kass, Reef the Lost Cauze, Sabac Red, Sean Price, Sicknature, Swifty McVay, Termanology, Thirstin Howl III, and Tragedy Khadafi among others. The album peaked at number 75 on the Top R&B/Hip-Hop Albums and number 47 on the Heatseekers Albums.

Track listing

Personnel 
 Manuel "DJ Illegal" Rückert – primary artist, producer (tracks: 1-30, 32), executive producer
 Johann Sebastian Kuster – primary artist, producer (tracks: 1-30, 32)
 D. "Det Gunner" Keller – primary artist, producer (tracks: 1-30, 32)
 Charles Wilson, Jr. – executive producer
 DJ Danetic – scratches (tracks: 18, 30, 32)
 XRatedTheDj – scratches (track 14)

Charts

References

External links 
 

2012 albums
Babygrande Records albums